Revue Hebdomadaire was a newspaper of the French rightist group Redressement Français.

Defunct newspapers published in France
French Third Republic
Publications with year of establishment missing